Acragas mendax is a species of jumping spider in the genus Acragas. The scientific name of this species was first published in 1978 by Bauab & Soares. These spiders are  found in Brazil.

References

External links 

mendax
Spiders of Brazil
Spiders described in 1978